Ernest Cœurderoy, (born at 22 January 1825 at Avallon (Yonne); died at 21 October 1862 at Geneva was a medical doctor, a revolutionary journalist and a French libertarian writer. He lived in exile for most of his life and committed suicide.

Cœurderoy vigorously opposed the republican and socialist leaders who he saw as responsible for the defeat of the 1848 Revolution in France, which he had participated in. Under the triple influence of Charles Fourier, Pierre Leroux and Pierre-Joseph Proudhon, he advocated for a system that was a "synthesis of collectivism and libertarian mutualism". He demanded collective ownership of the means of production, free access for all to work instruments, individual property and the mutual exchange of labor products.

References

1825 births
1862 deaths
Anarchist writers
Collectivist anarchists
French anarchists
French male non-fiction writers
French physicians
French political writers
French revolutionaries
Libertarian theorists
Mutualists
People from Avallon
Suicides in Switzerland